The Tokyo Metropolitan Indoor Swimming Pool is an aquatics venue located in Tokyo. It hosted the water polo tournament during the 1964 Summer Olympics.

It was constructed initially as the swimming venue for the 1958 Asian Games.

References 
1964 Summer Olympics official report. Volume 1. Part 1. p. 121.
Official Site

Buildings and structures in Shibuya
Venues of the 1964 Summer Olympics
Olympic water polo venues
Sports venues in Tokyo
Swimming venues in Japan
Venues of the 1958 Asian Games
Asian Games diving venues
Asian Games swimming venues
Asian Games water polo venues
Sports venues completed in 1958
1958 establishments in Japan